The Snigole River is a tributary of the north shore of the Malbaie River flowing generally to the south, especially in the zec du Lac-au-Sable in the unorganized territory of Mont-Élie, then in the territory of Clermont at the end of the route, in the Charlevoix-Est Regional County Municipality, in Quebec, Canada.

It flows south between the “ruisseau des Américains” (American Creek) (west side) and the Jacob River (east side). After several rounds of rapids, waterfalls and falls in the forest area, the Snigole River flows into the Malbaie River facing the “montagne de la Croix” (mountain of the cross).

The east bank of this small forest valley is mostly accessible by the “chemin des Marais” (path of the Marshes) which goes to the North. Forestry is the main economic activity of the sector; recreational tourism activities, second.

The surface of this stream is generally frozen from mid-December to late-March. Nevertheless, safe ice traffic is generally from late December to mid-March.

Geography 
The Snigole River originates at “Deuxième lac des Marais” (Second Marsh Lake) (length: ,) located on the southeastern side of Mont-Élie in the zec du Lac-au-Sable. This wild lake is located in a small forest and recessed valley. This lake is aptly named because of marshes on the northwestern shore of the lake.

From the mouth of the Second Marsh Lake, the current flows over  according to the following segments:
  south through several series of rapids and waterfalls, and branch westward at the end of the segment to get around a mountain, up to a bend in the river, where a stream (coming from the west) flows there;
  southeasterly, then southerly, in a well-formed valley through three sets of rapids, to the confluence of the marsh stream (coming from the west);
  southeasterly under the “chemin des Marais” (Marsh Road) bridge, then easterly to its confluence with the Malbaie River.

Toponymy 
The origin of the term "Snigole" is uncertain. The first hypothesis would be the deformation of the English word "sea gull", meaning "gull"; these domineering birds are usually very present here, except in winter. A second hypothesis is that "Snigole" is similar to the term "Snieguole" meaning "snowman" in the Latvian language. A third hypothesis is that "Snigole" is similar to the term "Smigole" which is a rare name.

The name "Snigole River" was formalized on December 5, 1968, at the Bank of Place Names of the Commission de toponymie du Québec.

Notes et references

Annexes

Related Articles 
 Zec du Lac-au-Sable, a controlled harvested zone
 Mount-Élie, an unorganized territory
 Clermont, a municipality
 Malbaie River, a watercourse
 List of rivers of Quebec

External links 

Rivers of Capitale-Nationale
Tributaries of the Saint Lawrence River